Flirting is a playful, romantic or sexual overture by one person to another.

Flirt, Flirting or Flirtation may also refer to:

Film
 Flirt (1983 film), an Italian-French drama by Roberto Russo
 Flirt (1995 film), an American film by Hal Hartley
 The Flirt (1917 film), an American comedy short starring Harold Lloyd
 The Flirt (1922 film), an American silent comedy film by Hobart Henley
 Flirtation (1927 film), a German silent drama film by Jacob Fleck and Luise Fleck
 Flirtation (1934 film), an American drama film by Leo Birinsky
 Flirting (film), a 1991 Australian coming-of-age film by John Duigan

Music
 The Flirts, an American dance music group
 Flirt (album), a 1988 album by Evelyn King
 Flirt, an unreleased album by Eve
 "Flirt", a 2022 song by Ale Zabala, representing Florida in the American Song Contest

Transport
 HMS Flirt, six ships of the British Royal Navy
 Jeanneau Flirt, a French sailboat design
 Sky Flirt, a Czech paraglider design
 Stadler FLIRT (Fast Light Innovative Regional Train), an electric commuter train

Other uses
 Flirtation (novel), an 1827 novel by Lady Charlotte Bury
 Flirt (chimpanzee), a chimpanzee of the Kasakela chimpanzee community
 Flirt (novel), a 2010 book in the Anita Blake: Vampire Hunter series
 Flirt FM, a radio station in Ireland
 Flirt!, a branded college mixer at some British universities

See also 
 Flirtation Peak, a mountain in Colorado
 The Flirtations (disambiguation)